Hebius is a genus of snakes in the family Colubridae.

Geographic range
The genus Hebius is endemic to Asia.

Taxonomy
All of the member species of the genus Hebius were formerly placed in the genus Amphiesma, but in 2014 Guo et al. placed most species of Amphiesma in the genus Hebius. They placed other species in the genus Herpetoreas, leaving Amphiesma a monotypic taxon containing only the species Amphiesma stolatum.

Species
The following 46 species are recognized as being valid.
Hebius andreae (Ziegler & Quyet, 2006) – Andrea’s keelback
Hebius annamensis Bourret, 1934 – Annam keelback
Hebius arquus (David & G. Vogel, 2010)
Hebius atemporalis (Bourret, 1934) – Tonkin keelback
Hebius beddomei (Günther, 1864) – Nilgiri keelback, Beddome’s keelback
Hebius bitaeniatus (Wall, 1925) – Kutkai keelback
Hebius boulengeri (Gressitt, 1937) – Tai-yong keelback, Boulenger’s keelback
Hebius celebicus (W. Peters & Doria, 1878) – Sulawesi keelback
Hebius chapaensis Bourret, 1934 – Vietnam water snake
Hebius clerki (Wall, 1925) – Yunnan keelback
Hebius concelarus (Malnate, 1963)
Hebius craspedogaster (Boulenger, 1899) – Kuatun keelback
Hebius deschauenseei (Taylor, 1934) – northern keelback, Deschauensee’s keelback
Hebius flavifrons (Boulenger, 1887) – Sabah keelback
Hebius frenatus (Dunn, 1923) – bridled keelback
Hebius groundwateri (M.A. Smith, 1922) – Groundwater's keelback
Hebius igneus David, G. Vogel, T.Q. Nguyen, Orlov, Pauwels, Teynié & Ziegler, 2021
Hebius inas (Laidlaw, 1901) – Malayan mountain keelback
Hebius ishigakiensis (Malnate & Munsterman, 1960) – Yaeyama keelback
Hebius johannis (Boulenger, 1908) – Johann's keelback
Hebius kerinciensis (David & Das, 2003)
Hebius khasiensis (Boulenger, 1890) – Khasi Hills keelback, Khasi keelback
Hebius lacrima Purkayastha & David, 2019 – crying keelback  
Hebius leucomystax (David, Bain, T.Q. Nguyen, Orlov, G. Vogel, Thanh & Ziegler, 2007) – white-lipped keelback
Hebius metusia (Inger, E. Zhao, Shaffer & G. Wu, 1990) – Wa Shan keelback 
Hebius miyajimae (Maki, 1931) – Maki's keelback 
Hebius modestus (Günther, 1875) – modest keelback 
Hebius nicobariensis (Sclater, 1891) – Nicobar Island keelback 
Hebius nigriventer (Wall, 1925)
Hebius octolineatus (Boulenger, 1904) – eight-lined keelback
Hebius optatus (Hu & E. Zhao, 1966) – Mount Omei keelback
Hebius parallelus (Boulenger, 1890) – Yunnan keelback
Hebius petersii (Boulenger, 1893) – Peters's keelback
Hebius popei (Schmidt, 1925) – Pope's keelback
Hebius pryeri (Boulenger, 1887) – Pryer's keelback
Hebius sanguineus (Smedley, 1931) – Cameron Highlands keelback
Hebius sangzhiensis Zhou et al., 2019 – Sangzhi keelback
Hebius sarasinorum (Boulenger, 1896) – Sarasin’s keelback
Hebius sarawacensis (Günther, 1872) – Sarawak keelback
Hebius sauteri (Boulenger, 1909) – Kosempo keelback
Hebius septemlineatus (Schmidt, 1925) – Tengchong keelback
Hebius taronensis (M.A. Smith, 1940) – Kachin keelback
Hebius terrakarenorum Hauser, Smits, & David, 2022
Hebius venningi (Wall, 1910) – Chin Hills keelback
Hebius vibakari (H. Boie, 1826) – Japanese keelback
Hebius viperinus (Schenkel, 1901)
Hebius weixiensis Hou, Yuan, Wei, G. Zhao, G. Liu, Y. Wu, Shen, Chen, Guo & Che, 2021 – Weixi keelback
Hebius yanbianensis Q. Liu, Zhong, Wang, Y. Liu & Guo, 2018) – Yanbian keelback

Nota bene: A binomial authority in parentheses indicates that the species was originally described in a genus other than Hebius.

References

Further reading
Guo, Peng; Zhu, Fei; Liu, Qin; Zhang, Liang; Li, Jian X.; Huang, Yu Y.; Pyron, R. Alexander (2014). "A taxonomic revision of the Asian keelback snakes, genus Amphiesma (Serpentes: Colubridae: Natricinae), with description of a new species". Zootaxa 3873 (4): 425–440.
Thompson JC (1913). "Contributions to the Anatomy of the Ophidia". Proceedings of the Zoological Society of London 1913: 414–425. (Hebius, new genus, p. 424).

Hebius
Snake genera